USS Spitfire was a bomb ketch converted from a sloop that served the U.S. Navy during the early years of the republic. She carried ammunition for the U.S. Navy warships in the Mediterranean in their battles with the Barbary pirates, and was later involved in the Little Belt affair prior to the War of 1812.

Service history 

The second ship to be so named by the Navy, Spitfire—a merchant sloop built in Connecticut in 1803—was purchased by the Navy at Boston, Massachusetts, on 25 April 1805; was commissioned the same day; and converted to a bomb ketch by the Boston Navy Yard. Commanded by Midshipman Daniel McNeill, Jr., Spitfire sailed for the Mediterranean on 23 June 1805 and reached Gibraltar on 1 August. The bomb ketch operated in the Mediterranean supporting American operations against the Barbary powers until sailing for home on 3 June 1806. She arrived at Charleston, South Carolina, on 19 July and was placed in ordinary at Norfolk, Virginia, on 3 August 1806.

The ship reactivated in July 1807 under command of Midshipman F. Cornelius de Kroff but remained at Norfolk until laid up again in December. Guerriere impressed the apprentice sailing master of Spitfire, John Diggio, a citizen of Maine. The ensuing Little Belt affair provoked a diplomatic furor between the United States and Great Britain, and contributed to the tense atmosphere between the two powers prior to the War of 1812. Spitfire was broken up at the Norfolk Navy Yard in 1820.

References
 

Ships built in Connecticut
Ammunition ships of the United States Navy
Barbary Wars American ships
Ketches of the United States Navy
1800s ships